Glam is a 1997 experimental drama film directed by Josh Evans.

Plot
Sonny (William McNamara) travels to Los Angeles to visit his cousin Franky (Frank Whaley), and is introduced to a grim world of sex and violence.

Cast
 William McNamara as Sonny Daye
 Frank Whaley as Franky Syde
 Natasha Gregson Wagner as Vanessa Mason
 Valérie Kaprisky as Treasure
 Tony Danza as Sid Dalgren
 Jon Cryer as Jimmy Pells
 Ali MacGraw as Lynn Travers
 Donal Logue as Tom Stone

Production
The film was Josh Evans' second effort as a director, following 1994's Inside the Goldmine, which also featured actress Natasha Gregson Wagner. When Inside the Goldmine performed well at Seattle and Montreal festivals, independent film company Cineville agreed to back his next project Glam. Cineville were able to finance its seven figure budget through foreign pre-sale contracts.

Music
Once principal photography wrapped in Los Angeles, Evans flew to Europe to work on the film's score with German electronic duo Mouse on Mars. Evans would end up rejecting the soundtrack they created, due to its overly experimental and unorthodox sound, instead creating his own electronic score. Mouse on Mars later released their music for Glam in 1998, to critical acclaim.

Release
Glam premiered at the Vancouver International Film Festival in October 1997. Prior to being released in America, the film received an NC-17 rating for "a scene of explicit sexuality and some sexual dialogue."

Reception
Leonard Klady of Variety reviewed the film in November 1997, stating "Josh Evans’ second feature, Glam, is another downbeat saga certain to enhance his rep but unlikely to break the bounds of specialized exhibition. A grim tale of Hollywood hustlers and marginals, the film is confident, disturbing and sometime diffuse. A technical tour de force, its assured vision will divide both audiences and critics but will leave an indelible impression on the few willing to venture inside the nightmarish world."

Kevin Thomas of the Los Angeles Times wrote in 1998 that "Evans really is fearless: He's made the kind of picture that those who aren't ready to go along with him will dismiss as arty and pretentious but that pays off for those willing to pay attention and go the distance."

References

External links 
 
 
 

1997 films
1997 drama films
Films set in Los Angeles
American drama films
1990s English-language films
1990s American films